Chris Hosea (born November 11, 1973, Princeton, New Jersey) is an American poet. Hosea earned his AB in English from Harvard University.  He later graduated with an MFA in Poetry from the University of Massachusetts Amherst's MFA Program for Poets & Writers.  Pulitzer Prize-winning poet John Ashbery selected Hosea's first poetry collection, Put Your Hands In, for the Walt Whitman Award from the Academy of American Poets. Ashbery, in his judge's citation for the Walt Whitman Award, compared Hosea's work to that of Marcel Duchamp, and wrote that his poetry "somehow subsumes derision and erotic energy and comes out on top...One feels plunged in a wave of happening that is about to crest." Outrider poet Anne Waldman, presenting the Whitman Award, said, "[Hosea's] poetry carries a refreshing, unpretentious sexual candor, making now-you-see-it, now-you-don’t moves like an illusionist, and is contemporary without being facile."

Put Your Hands In 
Reviewers of Put Your Hands In have highlighted the book's emphasis on contradiction, the absurd, and sound, comparing it to the work of Language poets. Poet and critic Stu Watson described Hosea's poetry as "not a confession but a revelation," calling it the product of "an impossibly refined imaginative vision, a vision that, remarkably open to interpretation, manages to reveal almost nothing about its creator, the poet beyond the page, while disclosing volumes about the contemporary reality in which that poet lives." Cristina M Rau critiqued the book's "distracting...references to hyper-contemporary technology that simply does not seem to fit: iPhones, Facebook, Uggs, Instagram," but added that "The pieces confuse and delight and reveal in a mostly successful way." Publishers Weekly found that Put Your Hands In "juggles sexualized imagery, contemporary and historical pop cultural references, and an inventive approach to language that is as relentlessly provocative as it is approachable." Library Journal described Hosea's poetry as an "energized, tumbling mass of tight-stitched imagery" that "presents a sort of nutty roadshow of American culture."

Double Zero 
Hosea's second book of poems, Double Zero, was published in 2016 by Prelude. Poet Ben Fama called the collection "by turns melancholy, fragmented, and true to feeling....a book-length artist statement via linguistic selfies," and claimed that Double Zero "accurately maps the experience of the contemporary subject." The Brooklyn Rail called Hosea's poetry "a statement for our generation," and noted that "Hosea’s excess of language and sensation, more than any recent poetry collection, captures the unlimited economy of text and experience in 2016, a life that is constantly refreshing as our thumbs push forward on our personal screens, “pictures quoted in pictures.” Writing in Jacket2, poet and critic Joe Fletcher described Double Zero as follows: "These poems reject the model of surface and substratum, linear chains of logic, narrative, or meditation — poetry that conceals and ultimately bestows upon the diligent reader a kernel of meaning. Instead, Hosea’s poems are horizontally distributed linguistic planes, glittering splinters of the quotidian sliding through one another, shrapnel of heterogeneous temporalities." Double Zero was named a "Best Poetry Book of 2016" by Flavorwire and Entropy Magazine.

Curation, Residencies, and Visual Art 
Hosea was curator of the Brooklyn-based Blue Letter Reading Series, which was named "Best Reading Series (Poetry)" in New York City by The L Magazine. Hosea is the recipient of fellowship residencies from Vermont Studio Center, Writers Omi Ledig House, and Elizabeth Bishop House in Great Village, Nova Scotia. Hosea was also the recipient of a 2016 artist residency from the Massachusetts Museum of Contemporary Art. Hosea's visual-art collaboration with painter Kim Bennett was the subject of a 2015 exhibition at Bushwick, Brooklyn gallery Transmitter. Also included in the Transmitter show were selected postcards from Hosea's continuing mail-art work The postcard project (aka "What do you feel?" 2011-ongoing). Hosea was curator of the 2012 group show "Ode to Street Hassle" at BronxArtSpace that featured Zoe Leonard, Amy Touchette, Myles Paige, Kim Bennett, Kimi Hodges, and others.

Bibliography 
"Put Your Hands In" (LSU Press, 2014) Read at Internet Archive
"Double Zero" (Prelude, 2016)

References

External links 
 Chris Hosea Author Page at the Academy of American Poets
 Chris Hosea Author Page at The Poetry Foundation
 Chris Hosea Author Page at LSU Press
 Chris Hosea Author Page at Prelude Books

Harvard University alumni
University of Massachusetts Amherst MFA Program for Poets & Writers alumni
1973 births
Living people
American male poets
21st-century American poets
21st-century American male writers